Jean Carmen (April 7, 1913 – August 26, 1993) was an American film, stage, and radio actress. She sometimes went by the stage name Julia Thayer. In addition to her appearances in various films throughout the 1930s, Carmen starred on Broadway in the original production of The Man Who Came to Dinner, appearing as a replacement for the role of June Stanley. In her later career, Carmen wrote, directed, and produced the film The Pawn in 1966.

Biography
Born in Portland, Oregon on April 7, 1913, Carmen was selected as one of the WAMPAS Baby Stars in 1934, the last year they were named. She had a supporting role as The Rider in the 1937 Republic Pictures western serial The Painted Stallion. She also worked in radio and on Broadway, in Stage Door and the original 1939 production of The Man Who Came to Dinner (as a replacement for the role of June Stanley). Modern audiences will also remember Carmen as one of three gold diggers in the 1938 Three Stooges comedy Healthy, Wealthy and Dumb. She married Barrett Collyfer Dillow in 1949, whose family headed the B.F. Goodrich Company.

In 1966, Carmen wrote, directed, and produced the film The Pawn, credited as Jean Carmen Dillow. During this time, she resided in Greenwich, Connecticut. Her son, Guy Dillow, starred in the film.

She should not be confused with another actress with a similar name, Jeanne Carmen, who was active in the 1950s and 1960s.

Death
Carmen died on August 26, 1993, in Charleston, South Carolina.

Filmography

Stage credits

References

External links

1913 births
1993 deaths
American film actresses
American stage actresses
Actresses from Charleston, South Carolina
Actresses from Portland, Oregon
American women film directors
American women screenwriters
20th-century American actresses
20th-century American singers
WAMPAS Baby Stars
20th-century American women writers
20th-century American screenwriters